Hit the Night is a 2017 South Korean melodrama romance film directed by Jeong Ga-young. It made its world premiere at the 22nd Busan International Film Festival, winning Actor of the Year Award (for Park Jong-hwan) and Vision-Director's Award.

Synopsis
Ga-yeong (Jeong Ga-young), a young filmmaker, tries to seduce Jin-hyeok (Park Jong-hwan) under the pretext of doing a research for her script.

Cast
 Jeong Ga-young as Ga-yeong
 Park Jong-hwan as Jin-hyeok 
 Hyung Seul-woo as Jin-hyeok's friend

Awards and nominations

References

External links
 

2017 films
2010s Korean-language films
South Korean romance films
2017 romance films
2010s South Korean films